Knut Hamre (born 3 March 1952) is a Norwegian Hardanger fiddle player.

References

Heilo Music artists
1952 births
Norwegian fiddlers
Male violinists
Living people
Place of birth missing (living people)
21st-century violinists
21st-century Norwegian male musicians